Minsterley is a civil parish in Shropshire, England.  It contains 24 listed buildings that are recorded in the National Heritage List for England.  Of these, two are at Grade II*, the middle of the three grades, and the others are at Grade II, the lowest grade. The parish contains the village of Minsterley and the surrounding countryside.  Most of the listed buildings are houses, cottages, farmhouses and farm buildings, almost all those dating before the end of the 17th century being timber framed.  The other listed buildings are a church, a group of tombs in the churchyard, a former toll house, a former watermill, a former malthouse, a milestone, a pump, a urinal, and a bridge.
 

Key

Buildings

References

Citations

Sources

Lists of buildings and structures in Shropshire